The Bundesvision Song Contest 2015 was the eleventh and final edition of the annual Bundesvision Song Contest musical event. The contest took place in the state of Bremen, following Revolverheld's victory with the song "Lass uns gehen" (Let's go) in the previous  edition.

Returning artists
Baden-Württemberg's  came fourth in the 2011 contest. Also Lower Saxony's Madsen also came fourth in the 2008 contest.

Participants

Scoreboard

References

External links
 Official BSC website at tvtotal.de

2015
Bundesvision Song Contest
2015 song contests